Dormition of the Mother of God is a major Christian feast.

Dormition of the Mother of God or Dormition of the Theotokos may also refer to:

 Cathedral of the Dormition of the Theotokos (disambiguation)
 Dormition of the Theotokos Church (disambiguation)
 Monastery of the Dormition of the Theotokos (disambiguation)

See also
 Church of the Mother of God (disambiguation)
 Cathedral of the Mother of God (disambiguation)
 Dormition (disambiguation)
 Assumption (disambiguation)